Weightlifting is the fourth studio album by the Scottish pop/rock band The Trash Can Sinatras, released in 2004.

Production
The album was financed by the band and through a grant from the Scottish Arts Council.

Critical reception
The Washington Post called the album "less jaunty than the band's early work, with a high percentage of string-swaddled laments about such subjects as faithless women, haunted widowers and unsolved child murders." Exclaim! wrote that "many of the compositions wander into slower, quieter places of lyrical introspection about love and love astray, while other upbeat numbers seem thrown in for good measure, abound with delightfully catchy guitar melodies and hopeful vocals." The A.V. Club wrote that "songs occasionally ride dangerously close to the adult-contemporary world (the weeping guitar on 'Leave Me Alone,' for example), but only in search of something simply adult."

Track listing

References

The Trash Can Sinatras albums
2004 albums